Prince Jean is a 1934 French drama film directed by Jean de Marguenat and starring Pierre Richard-Willm, Natalie Paley and Nina Myral. The story had previously been made as a 1928 silent film Prince Jean.

Cast
 Pierre Richard-Willm as Le prince Jean d'Axel  
 Natalie Paley as Claire d'Arlong
 Nina Myral as Madame de Grivelles  
 Alexandre Arnaudy as Liétard  
 Roger Karl as Le comte de Wavre  
 Aimé Clariond as Le baron d'Arnheim 
 Jean Debucourt as Le prince Léopold d'Arnheim  
 Gaby Basset as Fernande  
 Germaine Le Senne as La comtesse d'Osterwick  
 Georges Prieur as Le comte d'Osterwick 
 Anthony Gildès as Le conseiller Keller 
 Valdini as Le chanteur Italien 
 Doumel as Le garçon de café 
 Henri Jullien as Monsieur François 
 Georges Paulais as Harlingen 
 Léon Arvel as Le baron Denis  
 René Navarre 
 Pierre Marnat 
 Simone Montalet 
 Léna Darthès

References

Bibliography 
 Slavin, David Henry . Colonial Cinema and Imperial France, 1919–1939: White Blind Spots, Male Fantasies, Settler Myths. JHU Press, 2001.

External links 
 

1934 drama films
French drama films
1934 films
1930s French-language films
Films directed by Jean de Marguenat
Remakes of French films
Sound film remakes of silent films
French films based on plays
French black-and-white films
1930s French films